The 2019 BWF World Junior Championships was the twenty-first edition of the BWF World Junior Championships. It was held in Kazan, Russia at the Kazan Gymnastics Center from 30 September to 13 October 2019.

Host city selection
The original winner of the bid was Prague, Czech Republic, which was awarded the event in November 2017 during Badminton World Federation meeting at Jamaica, with Tipsport Arena as the proposed venue. Prague later withdrew and the Badminton World Federation later re-awarded the event to Kazan in November 2018 during the announcement of 18 major badminton event hosts from 2019 to 2025.

Medalists

Medal table

References

 
BWF World Junior Championships
International sports competitions hosted by Russia
Badminton tournaments in Russia
Sport in Kazan
21st century in Kazan
BWF World Junior Championships
BWF World Junior
BWF World Junior
BWF World Junior
BWF World Junior